The sack (plundering) of Santiago de Compostela occurred in 968 AD, when a Viking fleet led by Gunrod entered and sacked the city of Santiago de Compostela in northern Hispania (now Spain). The attack had been encouraged by duke Richard I of Normandy. Three years later Gunrod attempted to sack the city again; however, this time his fleet was met with a powerful army and the sacking was averted.

Background 
In the year 968, a Norwegian Viking fleet led by Gunrod went to help the duke Richard I of Normandy (the grandson of the Viking chieftain Rollo, first duke of Normandy), who was afraid of a possible invasion by the Carolingian king Lothair I of France. Once the Franks had been defeated, the fleet of Gunrod stayed in Normandy, becoming a threat for Richard, so the Norman duke sent the Norsemen to another place by telling them about the existence of an important pilgrimage site in the north of Hispania, Santiago de Compostela, where they could pillage a huge treasure. The fleet of Gunrod reached Galicia the same year. They crushed the Galician army, and then entered and sacked the city of Santiago de Compostela. Three years after the sack of Santiago de Compostela, Gunrod attacked Galicia again, only to find a powerful army sent to put an end to the Viking expedition.

See also
 Vikings in Iberia
 Battle of Remich
 Viking raid on Galicia and Asturias
 The Andalusi leader Almanzor led a successful campaign against Santiago in 997.

References 

History of Galicia (Spain)
Santiago de Compostela
Battles involving the Vikings
960s conflicts
968
Viking Age in Spain